Panteleymon Shpylka (20 October 1883 – 5 March 1950) was a Ukrainian Greek Catholic clergyman. He was a co-founder and Head of the Council of the Komancza Republic, a short-lived microstate, an association of thirty-three Lemko villages, seated in Komańcza in eastern Lemkivshchyna from 4 November 1918 until 23 January 1919.

Early life
Fr. After graduated the Ukrainian Gymnasium in Przemyśl in 1904, he subsequently joined the Major Greek-Catholic Theological Seminary in Przemyśl, and after graduation and marriage, was ordained a priest on 15 March 1910, for the Eparchy of Przemyśl, Sambir and Sanok by Bishop Kostyantyn Chekhovych. In 1917 he was appointed as a parish priest in St. Onuphrius church in Wisłok Wyzhniy.

Political career
In the autumn of 1918 Austro-Hungarian Empire collapsed and was replaced by multiple successor states. In the village where Fr. Shpylka was a parish priest, began a popular movement. With his support was convened a meeting of the inhabitants of a closer villages. On 4 November 1918, more than 70 delegates from the surrounding villages came to the People's Assembly to Wisłok Wyzhniy. The delegates decided to join a new proclaimed West Ukrainian People's Republic in Lviv, but of a distance and a war time was organised an Eastern Lemko Republic. Among other acts, also Fr. Shpylka was elected as a Head of the Council of the Republic. Later, he went to neighbouring countries, trying to attract the military and financial resources necessary for the Republic's existence, but did not succeed on this ground. When the army of another newly proclaimed state, Second Polish Republic, entered the territory of Komancza Republic, he avoided arrest, because he was in Czechoslovakia.

Life in emigration
Later years he spent as priest in Zakarpattia (1919–1944) and after the World War II he lived in a displaced persons camp in Regensburg, Germany, where worked as a priest and catechist among the Greek-Catholics (1944–1948). The last year of his life he spent in Canada, where served as an assistant priest in the St. Michael church in Dauphin, Manitoba.

He died in Winnipeg on 5 March 1950.

References

1883 births
1950 deaths
People from Lviv Oblast
People from the Kingdom of Galicia and Lodomeria
Ukrainian Austro-Hungarians
Members of the Ukrainian Greek Catholic Church
20th-century Ukrainian politicians
Canadian Eastern Catholics
Ukrainian expatriates in Slovakia
Ukrainian expatriates in Germany
Ukrainian expatriates in Canada
Ukrainian emigrants to Canada